Stephan van den Berg (born 20 February 1962) is a retired windsurfer from the Netherlands. He was world champion in 1983 and in the 1984 Summer Olympics, Long beach, California won the first Olympic Gold medal in the Windglider for the Netherlands. After that he turned professional and therefore missed the 1988 Olympics. He returned to amateurs to compete at the 1992 Olympics, Barcelona where he finished in seventh place in the Men's Lechner A-390.

Professional life
Stephan van den Berg is, with his brothers, owner of VANDENBERG Surf. With outlets in Almere, Hoorn and Zandvoort it is specialized in the popular sports like:
 Windsurfing
 Kitesurfing
 Wingfoiling
 SUP
 Watersports
 Winter sports

Further reading
  Dutch Olympic Committee

1984 Olympics (Los Angeles)

1992 Olympics (Barcelona)

References

External links
 
 
 

Living people
1962 births
People from Hoorn
Dutch windsurfers
Dutch male sailors (sport)
Sailors at the 1984 Summer Olympics – Windglider
Sailors at the 1992 Summer Olympics – Lechner A-390
Olympic sailors of the Netherlands
Medalists at the 1984 Summer Olympics
Olympic medalists in sailing
Olympic gold medalists for the Netherlands
Sportspeople from North Holland
20th-century Dutch people
21st-century Dutch people